Sahithikanth Galidevara (born 12 February 1987) is an Indian playback singer. She has recorded several songs in Telugu both in movies and albums.

Career

 She won the regional version of Sa Re Ga Ma Pa – Voice of Youth by Zee Telugu in 2008
 She was one of the 12 finalists in the first season of Sony TV's singing reality show X Factor India (2011)
 She participated in Super Singer 7.
 She won Super singer 8 in Telugu as a mentor in Star MAAtv.
 She was one of the finalists in Super Singer 12 Telugu in Star Maatv.

Discography

 "Jabba Kotti" – Pardhu (2008)
 "Mummy Daddy" – Ek Police (2008)
 "O Xanamaina Chaalu" – Siddu from Srikakulam (2008)
 "Chandamamala Andagadini" – Anaganaga O Dheerudu (2011)
 "Pillalame" – Tolisariga (2011)
 "Kavalante Istale" – Naku Oka Lover Undi (2011)
 "Singarenundhi" – Rachcha (2012)
 "Ruler" – Dammu (2012)
 "Nene Nani ne" – Eega (2012)
 "Gaji biji gathukula" – Sudigadu (2012)
 "Inka emi cheppalo" – Kamina (2012)
 "Naa swasalona pongindi" – Chanakyudu (2012)
 "née varasa neede" – Routine love story (2012)
 "Chal Challe" – Ongole Gitta (2013)
 "Kothaga née pairichayam" – biscuit 2013
 "Anu anu" – romance 2013
 "Soodimande" – Doosukeltha (2013)
 "Vastha vasthava" – prema geema janta nai (2013)
 "Milky meenakshi" – prema geema janta nai (2013)
 "magadheerudee" – rajakota rahasyam (2013)
 "love you ra" – Hum Tum (2013)
 "Neelakasam Karigi" – Mudduga (2013)
 "Adugulu kalisi" – Mudduga (2013)
 "Naa kallalona – Hum Tum (2013)
 Manasuni Mamathani" – Gallotelinattunde (2013)
 "Tirugubaatidi" – Basanti (2013)
 "O Ningey Thuli Holi" - Kaalicharan (2013)
 "Atu Amalapuram Remix" – Kotha Janta (2014)
 "Yevaritho modati adugu" – Green Signal (2014)
 "ohh kooni ragama" – Amrutham Chandamamalo (2014)
 "yeruvaka sagaro remix" – Amrutham Chandamamalo (2014)
 "Alli nodu" – Shivam 2105
 "Dreamigey bandhe" – Shivam 2015
 "Halavaru" – Buguri 2016
 "Rai Rai" – Rule (2016)
 "Silicon Valley Figure" - Oru Nodiyil (2016 - Tamil)
 "Simla Apple Naa Pere" - Parvathipuram (2016)
 "Boost pilla" – aaradugula bullet 2017
 "Pink lips" – loukyam
 "Bhagmathie theme song" – Bhagmathi
 "Neeyagigrein" - Yuvaratna (tamil 2021)
 Tereliye - Yuvaratna ( Hindi 2021)
 "Naa kaallaku patteelu" - Induvadana (2022)
 "Nene Special" - Sakala Gunabhirama (2022)
 "Nyayaanni" ("Mother Song") - Sebastian P.C. 524(2022)
 "Etthara Jenda" - RRR (2022)
 "Koelae" - RRR (2022) (Dubbed) - Tamil
 "Sholay" - RRR (2022) (Dubbed) - Hindi
 "Etthuka Jenda" - RRR (2022) (Dubbed) - Malayalam
 "Etthuva Jenda" - RRR (2022) (Dubbed) - Kannada

Albums
 What Happen to me, Velige Deepam, Plz Vinaddu from the album Plz Vinaddu (2011)
 Mudakaratha Modakam, Sumanovandita Sundari from the album Jayaghosha (2011)

Personal life
Sahithi changed her Name to Sahithikanth Galidevara as she is facing issues in credits mapping as there are few other singers named Sahithi and she is facing issues with that. Kanth is part of her husband's name which she has included in her name.Malani (23 July 2011) "I got eliminated for being a South Indian: Sahiti", The Times of India Retrieved 6 August 2011</ref>

References 

1987 births
Living people
Indian women playback singers
Singers from Andhra Pradesh
Film musicians from Andhra Pradesh
21st-century Indian singers
People from Vizianagaram
Telugu playback singers
21st-century Indian women singers
Women musicians from Andhra Pradesh